Lucy Glanville (born 16 October 1994) is an Australian biathlete. She has competed at the 2014 Winter Olympics in Sochi.

References

1994 births
Biathletes at the 2014 Winter Olympics
Living people
Olympic biathletes of Australia
Australian female biathletes
Cross-country skiers at the 2012 Winter Youth Olympics
Australian female cross-country skiers